General Potter may refer to:

Edward E. Potter (1823–1889), Union Army brigadier general and brevet major general
Herbert Cecil Potter (1875–1964), British Army brigadier general
James Potter (Pennsylvania politician) (1729–1789), Pennsylvania Militia brigadier general in the American Revolutionary War
Joseph H. Potter (1822–1892), Union Army brigadier general
Laura Potter (fl. 1980s–2020s), U.S. Army lieutenant general
Lorraine K. Potter (born 1946), U.S. Air Force major general
Robert Brown Potter (1829–1887), Union Army major general

See also
Attorney General Potter (disambiguation)